Zoran Jevtović (born 20 April 1958) is a retired footballer who played as a midfielder for clubs in Yugoslavia and Greece.

Club career
Jevtović began playing football with FK Rad, helping the club gain promotion to the Yugoslav First League.

In 1988, Jevtović moved abroad, joining Greek first division side Apollon Athens F.C. for four seasons. He would move to Greek second division side Atromitos F.C. for the 1992–93 season.

Career as manager
Following his playing career, Jevtović became a football manager. He led Thrasyvoulos F.C. during 2009.

References

External links

1958 births
Living people
Yugoslav footballers
FK Rad players
Apollon Smyrnis F.C. players
Atromitos F.C. players
Association football midfielders